Jararhagin (HF2-proteinase, JF1) is an enzyme. This enzyme catalyses the following chemical reaction

 Hydrolysis of -His10-Leu-, -Ala14-Leu-, -Tyr16-Leu-and -Phe24-Phe- bonds in insulin B chain

This endopeptidase is present in the venom of the jararaca snake (Bothrops jararaca).

References

External links 
 

EC 3.4.24